Petersburg, Ohio may refer to:
Petersburg, Carroll County, Ohio
Petersburg, Jackson County, Ohio
Petersburg, Mahoning County, Ohio
Coal Grove, Ohio, also called "Petersburg"